The 2015 FC Okzhetpes season is the club's first season back in the Kazakhstan Premier League, the highest tier of association football in Kazakhstan, and 19th in total. Okzhetpes will also take part in the Kazakhstan Cup.

Squad

Transfers

Winter

In:

Out:

Summer

In:

Out:

Competitions

Kazakhstan Premier League

First round

Results summary

Results by round

Results

League table

Relegation Round

Results summary

Results by round

Results

League table

Kazakhstan Cup

Squad statistics

Appearances and goals

|-
|colspan="14"|Players away from Okzhetpes on loan:
|-
|colspan="14"|Players who appeared for Okzhetpes that left during the season:

|}

Goal scorers

Disciplinary record

References

Okzhetpes